Eophyllophyton bellum is the oldest known plant bearing megaphyllous leaves. In 2013, Hao (one of the original taxon authors) and Xue placed the genus in a new class Eophyllophytopsida, considered to be an isolated lineage in the euphyllophytes.

References

Devonian plants
Prehistoric plant genera